The Miss Perú 1983 pageant was held on June 3, 1983. That year, 16 candidates were competing for the national crown. The chosen winner represented Peru at the Miss Universe 1983 and Miss World 1983. The rest of the finalists would enter in different pageants.

Placements

Special Awards

 Best Regional Costume - Cuzco - Verónica Nizzola
 Miss Photogenic - Tacna - Diana Puente
 Miss Elegance - La Libertad - Monique Gabuteau
 Miss Body - Loreto - Sheyla Morey
 Best Hair - Distrito Capital - Vivien Griffiths
 Miss Congeniality - Tumbes - Catherine Maldonado
 Most Beautiful Face - Tacna - Diana Puente

.

Delegates

Amazonas - Viviana Alvarado
Arequipa - Giuliana Estremadoyro
Cajamarca - Carolina Anduaga
Cuzco - Verónica Nizzola
Distrito Capital - Vivien Griffiths Shields
Huánuco - Úrsula Cuculiza
Ica - Patricia Ramírez
La Libertad - Monique Gabuteau

Loreto - Sheyla Morey
Moquegua - Verónica Rodríguez
Pasco - Karina Melgar
Region Lima - Lizbet Alcázar
San Martín - Brunella Taddei
Tacna - Diana Puente
Tumbes - Catherine Maldonado 
Ucayali - Jessica Roisenwit

Judges

 Rubén Toribio Díaz - Peruvian football soccer player
 Edith Barr - Peruvian Folk Singer
 Ofelia Lazo - Peruvian Actress
 Inés de Ronalds - Manager of Las Dunas Hotel
 Eduardo Bonilla - Manager of Creaciones Sheila
 Baruch Ivcher - Manager of Paraíso
 Fernando Gomberoff - Manager of Beauty Form
 Mario Cavagnaro - Creative Director of Panamericana Televisión

.

References 

Miss Peru
1983 in Peru
1983 beauty pageants